Basement Jack is a 2009 American slasher horror film, which was written by Brian Patrick O'Toole and directed by Michael Shelton, it stars Billy Morrison, Tiffany Shepis and Lynn Lowry.

Plot
A few years ago Jack Riley finally snapped and killed his abusive mother. After killing his mother he went from house to house killing entire families and arranging their bodies in poses that would suggest a happy home life. Jack was just a teenager when all of this happened so of course he didn’t go to jail, but he just got out of his institution and he’s out to finish what he started while a vengeful woman wants to make him pay.

Cast 

Eric Peter Kaiser as Jack Riley aka Basement Jack
Michele Morrow as Karen Cook
Sam Skoryna as Officer Chris Watts
Lynn Lowry as Mrs. Riley
Tiffany Shepis as Officer Armando
Billy Morrison as Detective Beck
Joel Brooks as Officer Wytynek
Nathan Bexton as the Manager
Monica Alvarez as Neighbor
Julianne Bianchi as Mrs. Cook
Aaron Borghello as Police Officer 2 (as Aaron Borghel)
Michael Patrick Breen as Mr. O'Donnell
Dakota Carter as Mark Caffola
Mark Elias as Ryan
Silvio Fama as Mr. Cook
M. Steven Felty as Sgt. Pignataro
Joshua Lou Friedman as Detective Barmack
Noel Gugliemi as Detective Anderson
Kim Knight as Tracy Caffola
Miriam Korn
Kyle Loethen as Rick Green
Les Mahoney as Detective
Billy Morrison as Detective Beck
Nic Nac as Ted The Delivery Man
Amanda Normington as Pam Wytynek
Teri Pluma as Mrs. O'Donnell
Kelly Ryan as Margie Caffola
Kyle Sanders as Young Jack
Jack Sanderson as Robert Caffola
Matt Santoro as Detective Mathieson
John Skoryna as Karl
Ben Tolpin as Newscaster Don Drury
Anna-Marie Wayne as Laverne
James Williams as Nick Cook

Production
The film's lead protagonist is played by American actress Michele Morrow and the titular villain is played by Eric-Peter Kaiser. Well known Scream Queens Lynn Lowry and Tiffany Shepis make major appearances in the movie as well.

Release
The film was released on November 17, 2009, but the original direct to DVD release was set on October 20, 2009.

References

External links 
 
 

2009 films
2009 independent films
2009 horror films
Films shot in Los Angeles
American independent films
American slasher films
2000s English-language films
2000s American films